Zaoqiao Township / Zaociao Township is a rural township in northern Miaoli County, Taiwan.

Geography
 Area: 
 Population: 11,707 (January 2023)

Administrative divisions

The township comprises nine villages: Dalong, Daxi, Fenghu, Jinshui, Longsheng, Pingxing, Tanwen, Zaoqiao and Zhaoyang.

Politics
The township is part of Miaoli County Constituency I electoral district for Legislative Yuan.

Education
 Yu Da University of Science and Technology

Tourist attractions
 Shan Gri-La Paradise
 Zaochiao Charcoal Museum

Transportation

The township is accessible from Tanwen Station and Zaoqiao Station of the Taiwan Railways. Taiwan High Speed Rail also passes through the central part of the township, but no station is located here. The closest HSR services are from Miaoli HSR station in Houlong Township.

References

Townships in Miaoli County